The Plaza Building, also known as The Plaza Condominiums, is a high-rise condominium building located in downtown Des Moines, Iowa, United States. It is currently the 5th-tallest building in the city, but will soon be the 6th after the completion of the skyscraper, The Fifth which will only be a couple blocks away. Designed by the architectural firm of Stageberg Beyer Sachs, Inc., the building was completed in 1985. It is  essentially a modernist building, but it exhibits elements of the Postmodern style. These are found in the light and dark colored banding at the base and the blue hipped and gabled roof.

History
In the 1980s, the Plaza joined the Civic Center of Greater Des Moines and Cowles Commons in helping to spur the revival of the downtown area. The Plaza overlooks these cultural attractions and one of the benefits of the building's design is that it is positioned at a 45-degree angle to give sunlight and views to as many residents as possible. Over the years, The Plaza has proven itself as a luxury living solution for downtown Des Moines with a continued return on investment.

There are currently 186 residential units with guidelines on the number of units that can be subleased to ensure owner interest in the building. Units vary from 650 to 5,000 square feet. The building is connected to the Des Moines Skywalk system, and has its own parking garage for residents underground. There is also a workout room as well as a pool on the third floor.

See also
 List of tallest buildings in Iowa

References

External links
 Official Plaza Website
 Plaza Facebook Page
 Dennis Sachs Architect, cite in pre-2006 Resume - Des Moines Plaza Commercial / Office / Condominium / Parking Project, Des Moines, Iowa
 Ted Glasrud Original Development Firm History Page

Residential skyscrapers in Des Moines, Iowa
Apartment buildings in Des Moines, Iowa
Residential buildings completed in 1985
1980s architecture in the United States
1985 establishments in Iowa